VRT may refer to:
 VRT (broadcaster), Belgium
 Vehicle registration tax (Ireland)
 Virtual reality therapy
 Vrt, Kočevje, Slovenia